Ashley Miles (born March 3, 1985) is a retired American gymnast who competed for the U.S. women's artistic gymnastics team at the 2001 World Gymnastics Championships in Ghent, Belgium.  The U.S. women won the bronze medal in the team event at 2001 Worlds, and Miles qualified to the vault final, where she finished eighth.

Elite career

A native of San Antonio, Texas, Miles was a member of the U.S. Junior National Team from 1997 to 1998 and 1999–2001, and she was a member of the Senior National Team from 2001 to 2003.

At her first U.S. Junior National Championships in Denver, Colorado in 1997, Miles placed second on vault and 10th all-around.

Miles placed eighth on vault and 21st all-around at 1998 Junior Nationals in Indianapolis, Indiana.

In 1999, she placed second on vault, ninth on balance beam and 12th all-around at 1999 Junior Nationals in Sacramento, California.

She also placed fourth all-around and fifth on beam at the Japan Junior International Championships.

At 2000 Junior Nationals in St. Louis, Missouri, Miles placed third on vault and 13th all-around.

As a first-year senior, Miles was named to the 2001 U.S. World Championship team following her fifth-place finish in the all-around at the 2001 U.S. Senior National Gymnastics Championships in Philadelphia, Pennsylvania, where she also tied for second place on vault and fourth place on uneven bars.

The next year, she placed third on vault and ninth all-around at 2002 Nationals in Cleveland, Ohio.

Miles also won the all-around and balance beam at the 2002 Spring Cup in Toronto, Ontario, Canada, where she placed second on vault and floor exercise. The U.S. women also captured the team title.

As an elite athlete, Miles trained with coaches Michael Harris at HUGS Gymnastics in Boerne, Texas  and with Kimberly and Steve Waples of South Texas Gymnastics Academy.

Collegiate career
Following her elite career, Miles accepted a gymnastics scholarship to the University of Alabama.

During her college career, Miles captured the NCAA national vault titles in 2003, 2004 and 2005, and she won the national floor exercise title in 2004.

Miles was named the National Collegiate Gymnast of the Year for 2006, and she also was a recipient of the Honda Sports Award for top NCAA athletes.

Career Perfect 10.0

References

1985 births
Living people
Sportspeople from San Antonio
American female artistic gymnasts
Medalists at the World Artistic Gymnastics Championships
African-American female gymnasts
U.S. women's national team gymnasts
Alabama Crimson Tide women's gymnasts
NCAA gymnasts who have scored a perfect 10
21st-century African-American sportspeople
21st-century African-American women
20th-century African-American people
20th-century African-American women